Marie, Duchess of Ratibor, Princess of Corvey, Princess of Hohenlohe-Schillingsfürst (Marie Agathe Augusta Gobertina Hubertina; née Countess Maria von Breunner-Enckevoirth; 23 August 1856 – 25 June 1929) was an Austrian aristocrat and consort of Victor II, the last reigning Duke of Ratibor and Prince of Corvey.

Early life and family 
Countess Marie Breunner-Enckevoirth was born at Schloss Grafenegg on 23 August 1856 to Count August Johann Breunner-Enckevoirth and Countess Agota 
Széchényi de Sárvár-Felsövidék. Her father was a member of the Austrian nobility. Her mother was from a Hungarian noble family. She was baptized as Maria Agathe Augusta Gobertina Hubertina in a Catholic ceremony the day after her birth. Her sister, Eleonore, was the wife of Karl Maria Alexander, 9th Prince of Auersperg. She was the aunt of Agathe Whitehead, the first wife of Georg von Trapp.

Marriage and issue 
On 19 June 1877, she married Prince Victor of Hohenlohe-Schillingsfürst, Duke of Ratibor and Prince of Corvey, in Vienna.

They had four children:
 Victor III, Duke of Ratibor (2 February 1879 – 11 November 1945); married in 1910 to Princess Elisabeth of Oettingen-Oettingen and Oettingen-Spielberg, had issue.
 Prince Hans of Hohenlohe-Schillingsfürst (8 March 1882 – 5 January 1948); married in 1918 to Princess Marie of Windisch-Graetz, no issue.
 Princess Agatha of Hohenlohe-Schillingsfürst (24 July 1888 – 12 December 1960); married in 1910 to Prince Friedrich Wilhelm of Prussia, had issue.
 Princess Margaret of Hohenlohe-Schillingsfürst (3 March 1894 – 1973)

Later life and death 
In 1893 her husband succeeded his father, Victor I, as the Duke of Ratibor and Prince of Corvey. Her husband died on 9 August 1923.

She died on 25 June 1929 at Schloss Rauden in Rudy, Upper Silesia.

References 

1856 births
1929 deaths
Austrian countesses
German duchesses
German princesses
House of Hohenlohe
Princesses by marriage
People from Krems-Land District